Joseph Howard Leonard (November 15, 1894 – May 1, 1920) was an American Major League Baseball player, born in Chicago on November 15, 1894. He died in Washington, D.C. on May 1, 1920.

Leonard played in parts of five seasons (1914, 1916–1920) with the Pittsburgh Pirates, Cleveland Indians, and Washington Senators. He recorded 179 hits over 791 at-bats in 269 games during his career. Defensively, Leonard was primarily a third baseman.

In 1918 Leonard's career was interrupted while he served in World War I.

See also
 List of baseball players who died during their careers

References

External links

1894 births
1920 deaths
Major League Baseball third basemen
Pittsburgh Pirates players
Cleveland Indians players
Washington Senators (1901–1960) players
Des Moines Boosters players
Columbus Senators players
Kansas City Blues (baseball) players
People from West Chicago, Illinois